Georgios Konstantinos Vouris ((1802 - 1860) aka Georg Konstantin Bouris was a Greek astronomer, physicist, mathematician, author, and professor.  He was a pioneer in 19th-century Greek astronomy.  Vouris lobbied tirelessly to create an astronomical observatory in Athens.  He was the first director of the National Observatory of Athens.  It was completed in 1846.  Greece reconnected with its Astronomical roots.  It was the first time since antiquity that a country named Greece played a significant role in Astronomy.  He was the first author to publish a university textbook in the field of mathematics since the inception of the new country.

He was born in Vienna to Greek parents.  He studied astronomy and mathematics with some of the most important scientists of the time namely Andreas von Ettingshausen and Joseph Johann von Littrow.  He did significant research in the fields of astrophysics, astronomy, geodesy, meteorology, number theory, calculus, and probability theory.  He moved to Greece and stayed in the country for sixteen years before moving back to Vienna where he lived out the rest of his life.  He played a significant role in the founding of the physics and mathematics department at the University of Athens.  He did significant research on the elliptical orbital calculations of Biela's Comet.  He died at the age of 57 on July 16, 1860, in Vienna.  He is buried in the city.

Early life 
He was born in Vienna, Austria.  His father was an entrepreneur.  He was from Ioannina and his mother was from Macedonia.  His father was Greek and enthusiastic about his heritage.  Georgios attended school in Vienna.  He enrolled at the University of Vienna in 1820.  He was eighteen years old.  He initially studied philosophy and law.  He earned a scholarship due to his exceptional performance as a student.  He was unhappy with philosophy and law and pursued astronomy and mathematics instead.  He was taught by Austrian scientist and astronomer Joseph Johann von Littrow.  He was also affiliated with Austrian mathematician and physicist Andreas von Ettingshausen.  He interacted with some of the most brilliant minds of the Austrian scientific community at the time.    

Georgios eventually became a teacher at the Greek school in Vienna from 1826 to 1836.  He continued his studies at the Vienna Observatory under the supervision of Joseph Johann von Littrow.  He was his doctoral student.  In 1832 Georgios published Elliptical orbit calculation of Biela's Comet from 96 observations of the year 1832 (Elliptische bahnbere chung des Biela'schen cometen aus 96 beobachtungen des Jahres 1832).  His paper was a comprehensive overview of the elliptical orbital calculations of Biela's Comet.  Georgios eventually decided to return to Greece.  He initially worked as a translator for the Austrian embassy.  The University of Athens was founded in 1837 and he became a professor of astronomy, physics, and mathematics.  Georgios also extensively contributed to meteorological observation since 1839.  He published a book entitled Meteorological Observations performed in Athens from November 1, 1839 until Jun 30, 1842 in Athens around 1843.  He was profound of the field of astronomy.

National Observatory of Athens

He lobbied to create the National Observatory of Athens.  He convinced Greek-Austrian entrepreneur and banker Georgios Sinas to fund the massive observatory.  When King Otto learned of the generosity he awarded Georgios Sinas's son the Order of the Redeemer.  The King also chose the architects for the building under Georgio's supervision.  He chose Eduard Schaubert and Theophil Hansen.       

Vouris was responsible for selecting and purchasing the correct instruments for the newly founded Observatory. The instruments he chose were a refracting telescope 158 mm in diameter.  It featured 6.2" (15.8-cm, 250cm focal length, f/15)  Plößl of Vienna. It was created by Simon Plössl. The second telescope was created by Christoph Starke of Vienna. He worked with optics by Fraunhofer of Munich. It was a meridional telescope 3.7" large (94mm, f/15, diameter 1m).  Vouris also purchased two pendulums and a timer.   Five small telescopes and a complete line of meteorological equipment.  They were the most advanced scientific instruments of the time.   
 
The foundation ceremony was on June 26, 1842.  In a notable speech Georgios discussed Meton of Athens and his astronomical observatory that was in the same city over 2200 years before.  The observatory was fully operational by 1846 and Georgios was the first director.  He continued his scientific work in the field of astrophysics, astronomy, and geodesy.  His articles were periodically published in Astronomische Nachrichten.  He became internationally renowned in the field of astronomy.               
  
The astronomer also did not publish several works.  Some of the works included a catalog for the complete determination of 1000 stars peculiar to Greece and the position of the Athens Observatory.  Georgios continued his scientific work.  He determined the geographic coordinates of the Observatory, which formed the basis for the mapping of Greece. He also published a five-volume, complete system of mathematics under the title Mathematical Series.  He did significant research on the movement of Sirius, Neptune, and Mars.  He made specific observations of Mars with the Athens Meridian Circle.  His research was used by American astronomer James Melville Gilliss.

Later Life Return to Austria
By the early 1850s, the popularity of the National Observatory of Athens declined the young Greek state was unstable and the National Observatory of Athens did not receive the funding it required.  Georgios had conflicting views with the leaders of the University of Athens and Ministry of Education.  Vouris fell ill in 1855, he decided to leave the National Observatory of Athens and return to Vienna.  He was replaced by Ioannis Papadakis.  Papadakis was the interim director for a short period of time and was replaced by Johann Friedrich Julius Schmidt.  

Back in Vienna Georgios focused the remainder of his life on research.  He continued writing and publishing articles in the field of astronomy.  He was one of the most important Greek astronomers since antiquity.  He published his Memoirs of the Athenian Observatory (Memoiren der Athenienser Sternwarte).  He continued his research and made significant contributions to number theory, calculus, and probability theory.  He significantly contributed to mathematics, physics, and astronomy.  He died at the age of 57 on July 16, 1860.  His unpublished work and library were sold to the observatory.  His library consisted of 663 books and manuscripts and his unpublished works.

Astronomical Education 1550-1830
Heliocentrism was forbidden by the Italian and Greek educational systems.  Greek astronomers Chrysanthus Notaras and Methodios Anthrakites were required to follow the established education of the church instituted by Theophilos Corydalleus.  Notaras's professor and advisor was Giovanni Domenico Cassini.   Notaras worked with Cassini at the Paris observatory in the 1600s.  The approved scientific education in the Greek world was secular in nature but promoted Aristotelean physics and the Ptolemaic astronomical system.  The educational system known as Korydalism was the only approved education by the Catholic and Orthodox Church.  Cesare Cremonini  was part of the inquisition that persecuted Galileo Galilei.  The church did not allow the idea of Heliocentrism.  The idea was reintroduced by Galileo Galilei and discovered by Aristarchus of Samos.  Both  Aristotle and Ptolemy accepted the geocentric model.  Cesare Cremonini   was Theophilos Corydalleus's doctoral advisor and professor.  Books by Galileo Galilei were on the forbidden books list until the late 1700s.  Notaras built astronomical instruments but did not add Heliocentrism to his book.  He added pictures that some scholars argue are a secret representation of the system.  Vouris and his contemporaries mark a new era in Greece's astronomical education.

Literary Works

See Also
Timoleon Argyropoulos

References

Bibliography

19th-century Greek mathematicians
19th-century Greek educators
19th-century Greek scientists
19th-century Greek astronomers
Greek astronomers
Greek meteorologists
Academic staff of the National and Kapodistrian University of Athens
19th-century Austrian astronomers
Writers from Vienna
Scientists from Vienna